Roy Howard (15 November 1922 – 6 August 2008) was an Australian cricketer. He played 29 first-class cricket matches for Victoria between 1946 and 1951.

See also
 List of Victoria first-class cricketers

References

External links

 

1922 births
2008 deaths
Australian cricketers
Victoria cricketers
Cricketers from Melbourne